FMA Architects Ltd is an international architecture, planning and interior design firm headquartered in Lagos, Nigeria.

History
Olufemi Majekodunmi established FMA Architects Ltd in 1973 as Femi Majekodunmi Associates. The firm is one of the foremost architectural firms in Nigeria. It was initially located at Odunlami Street before moving to St Nicholas Building, Lagos Island. Since then, it has expanded and grown its services most especially in Nigeria. The firm has diversified into various forms of architecture, design and construction in projects with the Nigerian government and corporate institutions. The firm currently maintains offices in the cities of Lagos, Nigeria,  Abuja in Nigeria, Pretoria in South Africa and Gaborone in Botswana

Completed Projects

St. Nicholas Hospital, Lagos Lagos Island.
Botswana Police College, Otse, 
Bank PHB Head Office Building, Victoria Island, Lagos
Sterling Towers, Lagos
Total Head Office, Victoria Island, Lagos
Renaissance Capital Office, Victoria Island, Lagos
South African High Commission, Abuja
IBRU Building Apapa, Lagos
Protea Hotel, Victoria Island, Lagos
NAL Towers, Marina, Lagos
Federal Ministry of Finance, Abuja
LandMark Office development for Great Brands, Lagos
Wheatbaker Hotel, Ikoyi, Lagos
GZ Factory, Lagos
ICC Office Park Garborone, Botswana
Chevron Texaco, Nigeria Ltd
Standard Chartered Bank Building, Victoria Island, Lagos
MTN Switch Center, Data centre, Ojota, Lagos
MTN Switch & Call Center, Asaba, Delta State.
MTN Switch Centre, Enugu
Mixed Use Development in Lekki, Lagos
Residential Developments at Adiva Plain Fields, Lekki-Epe, Lagos
Residential Development at FBN Mortgages, Abuja
Residential Developments, Banan Island, Ikoyi Island, Lagos
Luxury Condominiums, twin Lake Estates, Lekki, Lagos
UPDC Estates, Lekki, Lagos
Christ the Cornerstone International School, Ogun Stae, Nigeria
Esowofina Limited, Victoria Island, Lagos
Nicon Town Estates, Lekki Masterplan
Summerville Golf Estate Planning, Lekki, Lagos
All Souls Church, Lekki, Lagos
Our Saviours Church, Tafawa Balewa Square, Lagos

References

External links
FMA Architects Ltd official website
Architecture week

Architecture firms of Nigeria
Companies based in Lagos
Design companies established in 1973
Nigerian companies established in 1973